Indian embassy may refer to:

 List of diplomatic missions of India
 List of diplomatic missions in India